Nabeel's Song is the memoir of the respected Iraqi poet Nabeel Yasin and his extended family. It was written by United Kingdom journalist Jo Tatchell and published in the UK in 2006.

Nabeels's Song was nominated for the Samuel Johnson Prize in 2007 and shortlisted for the Costa (formerly the Whitbread) prize in 2006 and the Index on Censorship Awards the same year.

Outline
This book details Nabeel Yasin, a political activist and one of Iraq's most famous poets in his extraordinarily eventful life in Iraq through the 1950s, 60s and 70s during the rise of Ba'athism and the emergence of Saddam Hussein, and of repression, dictatorship and violence under the militaristic ba'athist regime.

Blacklist
In 1978 Yasin was added to the infamous cultural blacklist for his steadfast refusal to write poetry for the regime or to glorify Sadaam Hussein.

Exile
In 1979, following stalking and a strange assassination attempt Yasin, his wife and child, fled into exile. Before leaving, Yassin wrote: "This country has been conquered a thousand times .. No matter who occupies the seat of power ..., there is a greater human desire to explore the truth."

The book mentions what an itinerant family in exile must endure as well as the power of literary resistance. Poetry (sung or intoned rather than recited- hence the book's title) is the pre-eminent cultural form in Iraq. Yasin's writing  was considered revolutionary in that it fused a modern poetic approach ( particularly the use of abstract imagery) with traditional Iraqi historical form. His most noted works are Brother Yasin ( written in 1974) and the epic Mesopotamia which propelled him to literary stardom and made him one of the most loved young poets in Iraq during the mid-1970s. He was dubbed the Iraqi Bob Dylan at this time for his outspoken stance on freedom of speech, political hypocrisy and the fact that he seeme to have the ear of the young. It was the poem Brothers Yasin Again written in exile in London and published in a limited edition of just 500 that proved to be the most extraordinary of all his poems. 

It is believed that a single copy of this poem was smuggled back into Iraq overland during the early 1990s, was distributed through the literary underground, and became a rallying cry for those who were in opposition to Saddam's rule. The poem was often recited by rote as an act of defiance and it was journalist Jo Tatchell's piece on the poem's extraordinary journey back to Iraq that prompted the writing of the book.

References

20th-century Iraqi poets